Indigenous peoples in Guyana, Native Guyanese, or Amerindian Guyanese are Guyanese people who are of indigenous ancestry. They comprise approximately 9.16% of Guyana's population. Amerindians are credited with the invention of the canoe, as well as Cassava-based dishes and Guyanese pepperpot, the national dish of Guyana. Amerindian languages have also been incorporated in the lexicon of Guyanese Creole.

Customs and languages vary across the nations of Amerindians. Each group has a distinct language, although there is understanding between speakers of Pemon, Kapóng, and Macushi. According to a survey conducted by the Inter-American Development Bank, only 20% of households were fluent in their own language, and higher fluency was related to longer distance from the capital. Caribs have been historically viewed as a warrior people, and while there is inter-tribal rivalry, much of what remains today was instigated during European colonization.

A lack of writing system at the time of European contact has contributed to a wide array of spellings of group names; an example was the Warao, who had nearly 30 different variants according to early documents.

Post-Columbian History 
Early interaction with the Dutch involved trade, or militia services such as hunting escaped slaves which continued on into the 1800s for the British. The were viewed by European colonial governments as protectors of the lands, or their borders, from claims by Spain and France. Amerindians themselves were also viewed as needing protection, leading to policies of missionization. Early land concessions and rights granted to appease Amerindians in order for European interests to survive in the Guianas eroded with the end of slavery and the growing viewpoint that Amerindians were benefitting by the civilizing force of European culture. Missions and schools were founded from various Christian societies, and these continue to play an important role in many contemporary communities.

In 1899, the Hague tribunal to designate the border between British Guiana and Venezuela used evidence that by the accepting British sovereignty, the traditional lands of those tribes were thus a part of British Guiana.

The Constitutional Conference of 1965 recognized the rights of Amerindians. Contrasting with the paternalistic missionary approach, integration and assimilation became more important in the 20th century. In 1976, an Indigenous Residence was opened in Georgetown to provide accommodation for hinterland people visiting Georgetown for educational, medical or other purposes.

Titling is a key current issue for indigenous communities, with encroachment on traditional lands for mining, logging, or other commercial uses. Court cases have presented problems with economic activity performed in adjacent lands affecting Amerindian communities, such as pollution of water supplies.

Amerindians founded the Alleluia church, which combines Christian beliefs with Amerindian traditions.

Contemporary groups

 Akawaio (Also known as Acahuayo,  Acewaio, Akawai, or Ingariko), Mazaruni River basin and Venezuela
 Island Caribs, known as their mainland counterpart  Kalina (Also known as Cariña, Galibi, Kalihna, Kalinya, Kariña, Kari’nja), northeast
 Patamona (Also known as Ingarikó), west central, Brazil, and Venezuela
 Lokono (Arawak), Guyana, Trinidad, Venezuela
 Macushi, Brazil and Guyana
 Pemon (Arecuna), upland savannah, Brazil, Guyana, and Venezuela
 Waiwai, Amazonas, Brazil and Guyana
 Wapishana (Also known as Uapixana, Vapidiana, Wapichan, Wapichana, Wapisana, Wapishshiana, Wapisiana, Wapitxana, Wapixana) Brazil and Guyana
 Warao (Also known as Guarao, Guarauno, Warau, Warrau), Guyana and Venezuela

Nearby nations that may have had a presence in Guyana 

 Atorada, southwest and Brazil
 Auaké, Brazil and Guyana
 Jaoi (Yao), Guyana, Trinidad and Venezuela
 Mapidian (also known as Mawayana), southwest
 Nepuyo (Nepoye), Guyana, Trinidad and Venezuela
 Taruma, Guyana, Brazil, Suriname. Recognised in Maruranau by the Wapishana.
 Tiriyó

Notable people 
 Sydney Allicock former vice-president of Guyana
 Stephen Campbell Arawak politician
 Valerie Hart
Oswald Hussein
 Jean La Rose Arawak environmentalist and indigenous rights activist
 George Simon (b. 1947), artist and archaeologist
 Marcus Wilson

See also

 Amerindian Heritage Month (Guyana)
 Category:Indigenous villages in Guyana
 Demographics of Guyana
 Umana Yana

Notes 

 
Guyana
 
Ethnic groups in Guyana
Indigenous peoples of the Guianas